Nsuta-Beposo is a town in the Ashanti Region of Ghana.

References

Populated places in the Ashanti Region